Juan Antonio Gossaín Abdallah (January 17, 1949 –    ) is a Colombian radio national news director, chief editor, and journalist, as well as a novelist. He wrote the novel "The Ballad of María Abdala." He is well known for directing the RCN Radio Network (Radio Cadena Nacional de Colombia) from around 1984 to 2010 and during that time had his own radio program that was regularly broadcast in Colombia. Gossaín was a two-time winner in the radio journalism category of the Premio Nacional de Periodismo Simón Bolívar (Translated: Simón Bolívar National Journalism Award), a national award for Colombian journalism.

Personal 
Juan Gossaín was born in San Bernardo del Viento, Córdoba Department, Caribbean region of Colombia around 1949 to his parents Juan Gossaín and Berta Abdallah. Gossaín's father and mother had immigrated to Colombia from Lebanon. Gossaín studied at Colegio La Esperanza in Cartagena, a boarding school in Cartagena, from age 9 to 17. He married his wife Margoth Ricci on March 24, 1984, and the couple had two children named Danilo and Isabela, and he has at least two grandchildren named Juan and Ana Gabriela. Gossaín currently resides in Cartagena. He was hospitalized in 2012.

Career 
Juan Gossaín started his journalism career writing for El Espectador newspaper from around 1968 to 1971. He later became Chief at El Heraldo, Barranquilla.

Gossaín worked as the director of the RCN Radio station for about 26 years, from February 12, 1984 to June 30, 2010. Gossaín hosted a very popular morning talk show. One of his former colleagues at RCN was Humberto De la Calle, former vice president of Colombia and a negotiator during the peace process, about which Gossaín interviewed him. Gossaín retired in 2010. Over the course of his career as a journalist, he covered at least 10 presidential campaigns and even did a special for El Tiempo newspaper about electoral corruption.

Aside from radio journalism, Gossaín was responsible for writing several novels such as "La balada de Maria Abdala", "San Bernando del Viento", and "La mala hierba". His writing often contained attention grabbing language that enhanced his storytelling leaving his audience in suspense, unable to put his work down. These qualities of writing led Gossaín to be viewed as a fabulist known as someone with the capability of creating exhilarating stories about different characters.

Now that Gossaín is retired, he has opened a writing workshop for aspiring journalists. It is called Centro de Altos Estudios Juan Gossaín and he created this place so he could be able to teach young writers the art of narrating reality.

Notable literary works 
He wrote the novel "La balada de María Abdala." The story is about a dead man who returns to the living in order to witness the burial of his mother.

Puro cuento, 2004, was one of Gossaín's most popular and unique works. This novel contained eighteen stories that were results of stories that he knew and experienced after leaving Córdoba, Colombia. These stories were unique and different because the magic of the Caribbean that had previously been seen of his novels was almost completely absent. What Gossaín experienced and portrayed in this novel was the feeling of grayness and the buildings that invaded the souls of the people who lived in them. It had an unfamiliar tone and many of Gossaín's readers were hooked to the work that he had created.

In popular culture 
Luis Soriano operates a mobile book library, called a Biblioburro, that uses a donkey as his means of transport. He asked for a donation from Gossaín and received Gossaín's  second novel, "The Ballad of Maria Abdala", as well a Gossaín's report about Soriano's effort on RCN Radio, which led to further donations.

Impact
Gossaín was the recipient of The National Simón Bolívar Award in 1995 and 1997. The nominees and winners of the award are some of the most influential personalities of Colombia. The award is very respected and adored by Colombians making it a big accomplishment to win it. Gossaìn has proved how influential and respected his work is by receiving the award twice.

He has also participated in the Carnaval Internacional de las Artes (translated: International Arts Carnival) for three years with Juan Manuel Roca.

Awards
 The National Simón Bolívar Award in 1977, 1985, 1989 (Premio a la vida y obra en la modalidad de los medios electrÓnicos), 1990, 1991, 1995, 1997, 1998, 2000, 2003,
 Colombia-Spain Award for Best Journalist of the Year (Premio Colombia-España al mejor periodista del año)

Bibliography
La mala hierba
La nostalgia del alcatraz
La balada de María Abdala (2003)
Puro cuento 
San Bernando del Viento

References

External links 
City TV Interview where Juan Gossaín speaks about his relationship with fiction and non-fiction.
 Video:Las mejores anécdotas de los periodistas que han hecho parte de los 100 años de Cromos

1949 births
Living people
Colombian male writers
Colombian journalists
Male journalists